Ijombe is an administrative ward in the Mbeya Rural district of the Mbeya Region of Tanzania. In 2016 the Tanzania National Bureau of Statistics report there were 11,225 people in the ward, from 10,185 in 2012.

Villages and hamlets 
The ward has 6 villages, and 39 hamlets.

 Iwalanje
 Ibowola
 Ilembo
 Isyema
 Iwangwa
 Majengo
 Njohole
 Sogeza
 Ifiga
 Ijombe
 Ilanji A
 Ilanji B
 Ilowe A
 Ilowe B
 Mafyeko
 Mawe
 Shilongo
 Ntangano
 Igalama
 Ikeka
 Iwanda
 Majengo
 Nsheto A
 Nsheto B
 Nsongwi
 Mantanji
 Izumbwe
 Kijiweni
 Mecco
 Moshi
 Mpakani
 Hatwelo
 Halembo
 Ing'anda
 Mahambi
 Mangoto
 Masoko
 Mbowe
 Nsongwi juu
 Halanzi
 Ilangali
 Ilembo
 Mwatezi
 Simambwe
 Soweto

References 

Wards of Mbeya Region